Yengi Molk (also Romanized as Yengī Molk, Yengīmelk, and Yangī Molk; also known as Ingemulk and Yengeh Molk) is a village in Khosrow Beyk Rural District, Milajerd District, Komijan County, Markazi Province, Iran. At the 2006 census, its population was 545, in 118 families.

References 

Populated places in Komijan County